David Gregory Brainard (born February 9, 1975) is a Grammy nominated American record producer best known for his work in country music in the entertainment industry.

Early life 
Dave Brainard was born in Seoul Korea and raised in Omaha, Nebraska, the second of four children born to Greg Brainard, a retired Air Force Master Sergeant, and South Korean immigrant, So Un Jo. He graduated from Papillion-La Vista High School in 1993 and went on to attend University of Nebraska Omaha for 1 year. Afterwards Brainard served 5 years in the United States Air Force Band stationed at Offutt AFB in Omaha, NE, before moving to Nashville, Tennessee in 1999.

Early career 

In 2001 Dave Brainard began his publishing career writing songs for Balmur Corus Music. Afterwards Brainard wrote for Bigger Picture Music Group formerly Big Picture Music Group. In that time Brainard wrote songs for Neal McCoy, Sammy Kershaw, Kelly Coffee, Ricochet, Tebey Ottoh, and Brooks & Dunn. During this time Brainard went on radio tours, playing on the road with artists such as Rebecca Lynn Howard, Anthony Smith, Marcel, David Nail, and Jessica Andrews.

Brainard began recording Music Row demos for other contemporary songwriters, such as Chris Tompkins, Dierks Bentley, Craig Monday, Chris Wallin, Anthony Smith and produced Jamey Johnson's self-released debut album "They Call Me Country". Dave Brainard is a self-taught music producer known for his multi-instrumental ability and creativity.

deciBel Productions 

In 2006 Dave Brainard founded deciBel Productions LLC. Brainard founded Mix Dream Studios with engineer Brian Kolb at that time and the two businesses partner to perform artist development services. Designed as a studio and executive office, Mix Dream Studios has produced and collaborated with much of the Nashville creative community.

Jerrod Niemann 

In 2008, friend musician Jerrod Niemann sought production services from Dave Brainard to produce record "Judge Jerrod & the Hung Jury". The album was signed by Joe Galante to Arista Nashville as a completed work and went on to debut at No. 1 on the country albums chart.

Niemann experienced No. 1 single success with "Lover Lover", which went on to sell Platinum in digital single sales. “Judge Jerrod & the Hung Jury” went on to yield another top 5, Gold selling “What Do You Want”, and a top 20 in “Drinkin’ Song”.

Brandy Clark 

In 2011 Dave Brainard and deciBel Nashville produced highly acclaimed album “Twelve Stories” with Brandy Clark. "Twelve Stories" would go on to receive a Metacritic score of ‘universal praise’ and national critics (Rolling Stone, SPIN Magazine, NY Magazine) have recognized “Twelve Stories” as “one of the Best Country Albums released in 2013.”

In 2014, Brandy Clark was announced as an opener for Eric Church's "Outsiders World Tour". Brandy Clark was also nominated as New Artist of the Year by the Country Music Association in 2014.

Ray Scott 

American country singer-songwriter Ray Scott had independent success on Sirius XM's The Highway with his Dave Brainard produced hit "Those Jeans"(2012).

Brainard and Ray Scott collaborated on the production and promotion of Ray Scott's 2014 record "Ray Scott". "Ray Scott" has received positive international review.

Personal life
In September 2015, Brainard was hospitalized after being found unconscious with a broken jaw and missing teeth following an attack by an unknown assailant on Demonbreun Street in Nashville.

Production discography

References

1975 births
Living people
Record producers from Nebraska